Justin Clarke, better known by his stage name Ghetts (formerly Ghetto), is a British grime MC, rapper and songwriter. His music has been played on national radio stations such as BBC Radio 1, Kiss 100, BBC Asian Network, and BBC Radio 1Xtra. Currently, Ghetts is signed to independent record label Disrupt, and released his debut studio album, Rebel with a Cause, on 9 March 2014. Known for his hard hitting lyrics and intricate rhyme schemes, he is associated and has toured internationally with such acts as Kano and was a member of NASTY Crew.

Musical career
Ghetts was a member of grime collective NASTY Crew, however he left, saying that things had gone "pear shaped" due to the number of people in the group. He later went on to create the grime collective The Movement, including Devlin, Wretch 32, Scorcher, Mercston, Lightning, and DJ Unique.
Ghetts has made a number of well-known songs within the UK grime scene. In 2008, Ghetts was nominated for a BET Award for Best International Act: UK along with Chipmunk, Giggs, and Skepta. In the end, Giggs took home the award.

In October 2020, Ghetts collaborated with Fraser T. Smith in the production of Smith's debut album "12 Questions".

2005: 2000 & Life
After being released from prison in 2003, at the age of nineteen years, Ghetto put out his first release, 2000 & Life in 2005. The mixtape contains 24 tracks and numerous collaborations. 2000 & Life is widely regarded as pioneering within the context of grime music.

Initially after his release from prison, Ghetto was using the artist name "Freedom", however the name "wasn't catching on". His friends used to say he was "ghetto" and did "ghetto things", which began to catch on. Stormin, a fellow Plaistow-based MC, released a song called "Day By Day" which contained the lyric, "Back in the day me and my bredrin Ghetto". Following the release, he took on the name "Ghetto".

Ghetto featured on Kano's album Home Sweet Home. In 2004, they filmed the video for "Typical Me" together, and Ghetto accompanied Kano on touring with Mike Skinner.

2007: Ghetto Gospel
In 2007, Ghetto released his second pre-album mixtape Ghetto Gospel. The mixtape was a departure from his previous release, 2000 & Life, being more mellow and featuring tracks about his female relationships: girlfriends, sister, and mother. In interviews, he has stated that the mixtape's calmer tone is to "prove people wrong", as he does not want to be typecast as an aggressive and angry rapper.

 Ghetto Gospel was considered Ghetts' breakthrough of that year and era, with "Top 3 Selected" becoming an underground hit in its own right. He personally names this mixtape as his best body of work in many interviews.

The album is titled Ghetto Gospel to demonstrate that Ghetts has put his soul into creating it.

On 27 October 2007, Ghetts performed with Kano at the BBC Electric Proms, performing alongside a violinist.

Hypothetically, Ghetto Gospel was Ghetts' debut album in which he mislabelled it as a mixtape; due to a recent interview with Link Up TV where he described Ghetto Gospel being his first studio album, but became unsure as to what to label it due to industry influences and a lack of resources at that time to have called it a full LP. This means his debut album Rebel with a Cause (2014) is his second studio album.

2008: Freedom of Speech, Boy Better Know beef
On 10 March 2008, Ghetto released Freedom of Speech. It is predominantly a solo mixtape, and features no other producers aside Lewi White and Smasher (the pair responsible for "Back in Da Day").

Many grime fans say that Freedom of Speech is considered Ghetto's best body of work, especially with how dark and aggressive this mixtape was. Unknown to many, he also had "beef" with Boy Better Know (3 members from the crew that he had clashed previously in consecutive years) and two of the mixtape's songs were centered on each member of the crew. This type of promotion was what helped him increase record sales in famous retail stores. Some of the mixtape's content was banned from legal radio at the time, however, some of the songs' one-liners have go on to become famous trademarks in grime events.

It includes collaborations with Smasher, Griminal, Brutal, Chipmunk, and  Devlin. Ghetto stated that the mixtape is more akin to 2000 & Life than Ghetto Gospel. 

Ten years later, Freedom of Speech is still widely considered as a classic grime mixtape and most of the one-liners still get used for reloads in famous grime events such as Eskimo Dance.

2010: The Calm Before the Storm
On 12 July 2010, Ghetto, under the new alias Ghetts, released his fourth mixtape The Calm Before the Storm. Production was provided by the likes of Z Dot, Rude Kid, Nocturnal, Londoners Griminal, Devlin, and Maxsta, among others. On 13 March, Ghetts won an OMA (Official Mixtape Award) for his mixtape, The Calm Before The Storm. He is also featured on the song "On A Mission" with Dot Rotten and Opium on Mumzy Stranger's mixtape No Stranger To This.

2011–2012: Non-album projects
Ghetto's "Sing For Me (Electro Remix)"; produced by Rude Kid had attention from the mainstream market. The single was signed by All Around the World Productions, who specialise in electronic dance music and were home to acts such as N-Dubz and Cascada. On 21 February 2011, Grime Daily uploaded the official video of a song titled "Who's on the Panel". The song is directed at the MTV Base panel who presented the "Best of the Best: UK MCs 2010" show on Sunday, 20 February 2011. Ghetts was not in the list, and "vowed to make a track sending for the panel who cast the list and also vowed to shoot a video and have it on YouTube in the morning." The song and video was finished the next day, premiering on Kiss 100 the day before the video upload. On 25 February 2011, the song was made available to download on iTunes, along with another song titled "I Told Ya" featuring Rapid – which also had a video shot and uploaded by GrimeDaily on 24 February 2011. Ghetts collaborated with Cher Lloyd on her record "Dub on the Track" in 2011. He featured on Clement Marfo & The Frontline's single "Overtime". He released the single "On A Level" in late 2011. The official remix features Scorcher, Kano, and Wretch 32.

2010–2014: Rebel with a Cause
Ghetts' long-awaited debut album Rebel with a Cause was released on 10 March 2014 on the independent label Disrupt. The album campaign started with a spoken word video "Definition of a rebel", followed by the non-album single "The Cypher" which was released on 28 July 2013 and features all personas and elements of Ghetts' personality. The track peaked at number 9 in the iTunes hip-hop charts. The album's lead single "Rebel" became available to download when you pre-order the album from 2 February onwards.

On 19 September, US singer Chris Brown co-signed East London MC Ghetts and shared the video for his track "Feel Inside" declaring "What Ya'll Think?'.

Ghetts had reportedly recorded more than 150 songs for the album (with some footage of his demos found on YouTube). Release dates for Rebel with a Cause dated back from 2010; reportedly, it was meant to have been released after his mixtape The Calm Before The Storm. Unknown to many, the album was originally called The Justifications of J. Clarke, but in a 2010 interview with SBTV, he stated that he wasn't ready to have made an album of that manner.

2018: Ghetto Gospel: The New Testament
On 30 August 2018, Ghetts officially announced the follow-up to his 2007 release Ghetto Gospel, titled Ghetto Gospel: The New Testament, was due for release on 14 September 2018. Along with the album announcement, Ghetts shared the first single from the album, "Black Rose" featuring Kojey Radical. The album featured artists including President T, Wretch 32, Donae'o, Jordy, Suspect, Little Simz, Stefflon Don, Chip, Kojey Radical, and many more.

Ghetts also made singles after this album, including "Listen" (which was featured on the TV series Top Boy and made it onto the series' official album), "Drill Work" (produced by Swindle and is featured on Swindles' album No More Normal), "Bad After We" (with Kojey Radical & Shy FX which features on Shy FX's album Raggamuffin Sound Tape), and "Legends Don't Die" (honouring the deaths of artists involved in the grime scene; Stormin, Cadet, Depzman, and Esco).

2021: Conflict of Interest
On 19 February 2021, Ghetts released his third studio album Conflict of Interest. Backed by Warner Music, the album campaign involved the rollout of singles featuring other artists like Stormzy, Jaykae, Backroad Gee and Pa Salieu. The album was well-received and ranked highly on the charts, with Ghetts riding through London in tank while performing some tracks to push additional sales and streams. Conflict of Interest finished second on the Official Albums Charts, which is Ghetts’ highest chart position to date. The album received positive reviews, with some stating that the body of work will finally move Ghetts "out of the shadows of his better-awarded peers."

Political views
In November 2019, along with 34 other musicians, Ghetts signed a letter endorsing the Labour Party leader Jeremy Corbyn in the 2019 UK general election with a call to end austerity.

Discography

Studio albums

Mixtapes
2005: 2000 & Life
2007: Ghetto Gospel
2008: Freedom of Speech
2010: The Calm Before the Storm
2011: Momentum 
2014: Momentum 2 (The Return of Ghetto)

EPs
2010: Merry Christmas EP
2015: 653 - EP

Singles

As featured artist

Other charted songs

Filmography
The Intent 2: The Come Up (2018) - Jay

References

1984 births
Living people
English male rappers
Black British male rappers
Rappers from London
Grime music artists
People from Plaistow, Newham
English people of Grenadian descent
English people of Jamaican descent